Legends II: New Short Novels by the Masters of Modern Fantasy is a 2003 collection of 11 short stories by a number of  fantasy authors, edited by Robert Silverberg. All the stories were original to the collection, and set in the authors' established fictional worlds. The first Legends was published in 1998.

In 2004, the Legends II anthology was republished as two volumes, Legends II: Dragon, Sword, and King and Legends II: Shadows, Gods, and Demons.

Contents

Editions
 An eBook edition was published by Random House as a Del Rey edition on December 30, 2003 in the United States and Canada with 
 An audio book edition was published in 3 volumes by Random House as a Del Rey edition in the United States and Canada
 Volume 1 On sale December 30, 2003 with 
 Volume 2 On sale July 13, 2004 with 
 Volume 3 On sale November 9, 2004 with 
 A paperback edition was published by Random House as a Del Rey edition in the United States and Canada in 2 volumes
 Volume 1 On sale October 26, 2004 with 
 Volume 2 On sale October 26, 2004 with

See also

 Legends

References

External links
 
 

2003 books
Robert Silverberg anthologies
Fantasy anthologies
Tor Books books